Amy Palmiero-Winters (born August 18, 1972) is a below-knee amputee who currently holds eleven world records in various events. In 2010, she was awarded the James E. Sullivan Award as the top amateur athlete in the United States and the ESPN ESPY Award as the top female athlete with a disability in the world.

Personal life
Palmiero-Winters was born in Meadville, Pennsylvania, and competed in track and distance running from a young age. In 1994, she was involved in a motorcycle accident which crushed her left leg. After three years and twenty-five surgeries, her leg was amputated below the knee. She would not be able to run at all until three years after the amputation.

Early running career
In 2004, Palmiero-Winters entered the Silver Strand Marathon. Despite being five months pregnant and running on a prosthetic leg only meant for walking, she finished second in her division. She entered the 2005 New York City Triathlon the following summer, still using a walking prosthesis as well as a bike borrowed from her employer, and placed third in her division.

At this point, Palmiero-Winters decided to engage in running on a more serious level. After obtaining a highly customized prosthetic leg from A Step Ahead Prosthetics in Hicksville, NY, she decided to relocate to New York in order to become a member of Team A Step Ahead, a group of amputee athletes professionally coached and sponsored by A Step Ahead Prosthetics.

By May 2006, Palmiero-Winters had been training extensively and, with a new prosthetic, she ran the New York City Marathon in 3:24 and broke the world record for a below-knee female amputee by more than twenty-five minutes. She followed this up by running the 2006 Chicago Marathon in 3:04, which stands as the best marathon time for a below-knee amputee, male or female.

Ultramarathons
By 2009, Palmiero-Winters had decided to switch from marathons to the more demanding ultramarathons, which are races longer than the marathon distance of 26.2 miles. She would run ten ultramarathons between 2009 and 2010, finishing first in the female division at the Heartland 100 Mile in October 2009 and finishing first overall at the Arizona Road Racers Run to the Future twenty-four-hour race on December 31, 2009 by running 130.4 miles during the allotted time. It was the first time an amputee had won an ultramarathon.

After this performance, Palmiero-Winters was named to the US ultrarunning team for the IAU 24-Hour Ultramarathon World Championships in Brive, France. It was the first time an amputee had been named to a United States able-bodied championship team. On May 17, 2010, she finished 18th in the female division at the World Championships, running 123.99 miles.

Palmiero-Winters' next race was the Western States Endurance Run on June 26, 2010. She became the first amputee to finish the 100-mile race. By finishing in 27:43:10, she received the bronze buckle presented to runners who finish in under thirty hours.

In 2011 Palmiero-Winters became the first female amputee to finish the Badwater Ultramarathon. She had a finish time of 41:26:42.

In 2019 she became the first female amputee to finish the Marathon Des Sables.

Paratriathlon
Palmiero-Winters won her classification at the International Triathlon Union Paratriathlon World Championships in 2005 and 2006. In 2007, Palmiero-Winters was the first athlete with a physical disability invited to race in the elite able-bodied division of the NYC Triathlon.

In 2014, Palmiero-Winters became the first amputee, male or female, to complete the Ultraman triathlon, a 3-day, 320 mile race.

Awards
Palmiero-Winters was named USA Triathlon's Female Physically Challenged Athlete of the Year in 2006. She was awarded the 2009 AAU James E. Sullivan Award as the best amateur athlete in the country and also won ESPN's 2010 ESPY award as the top female athlete with a disability. In 2009, she was also named the director of Team A Step Ahead.

References

External links
 Amy Palmiero-Winters' Official Website and Blog
 A Step Ahead Prosthetics - Home of Team A Step Ahead, Designer/Builder of Amy Palmiero-Winters' Custom Prosthetics

1972 births
Living people
People from Meadville, Pennsylvania
American amputees
American female ultramarathon runners
American female marathon runners
American female triathletes
World record holders in Paralympic athletics
Sportspeople from Pennsylvania
James E. Sullivan Award recipients
Paratriathletes of the United States
21st-century American women